Hydrophilus  is a group of plants in the Restionaceae described as a genus in 1984.

There is  only one known species, Hydrophilus rattrayi, endemic to Cape Province in South Africa.

References

Restionaceae
Endemic flora of South Africa
Flora of the Cape Provinces
Fynbos